is a Japanese voice actress affiliated with Office Watanabe.

Filmography

Television animation
Asatte no Hōkō (Friend B)
Avatar: The Last Airbender (Toph)
Blood+ (Boy)
Clannad After Story (Yū)
Love Get Chu ~Miracle Voice Actress Hakusho~ (Tsubasa Ono)
Otogi-Jūshi Akazukin (Hiroto Kisugi)
Pandora Hearts (Young Gilbert)

OVA
Mizu×Mizu Drops (Sae Uran)
Shigofumi: Letters from the Departed (Takuma Renkon)

Radio
Fuiatsū (FarEast Amusement Research/Enterbrain, guest personality)
Yurishii: Azuma no Love Get Chu Miracle Radio (Osaka Broadcasting Corporation)

CD
Pandora Hearts (Young Gilbert Nightray)

External links
 
 
Genki Project 
Blog 

1984 births
Living people
Voice actresses from Fukushima Prefecture
Japanese voice actresses